The 2012–13 QMJHL season was the 44th season of the Quebec Major Junior Hockey League (QMJHL). The regular season consisted of eighteen teams playing 68 games each, began on September 20, 2012, and ended on March 17, 2013. This was the Sherbrooke Phoenix's first season in the league.

Regular season standings
Note: GP = Games played; W = Wins; L = Losses; OTL = Overtime losses; SL = Shootout losses; GF = Goals for; GA = Goals against; PTS = Points; x = clinched playoff berth; y = clinched division title

Scoring leaders
Note: GP = Games played; G = Goals; A = Assists; Pts = Points; PIM = Penalty minutes

Leading goaltenders
Note: GP = Games played; Mins = Minutes played; W = Wins; L = Losses: OTL = Overtime losses; SL = Shootout losses; GA = Goals Allowed; SO = Shutouts; GAA = Goals against average

2013 President's Cup playoffs

First round

(1) Halifax Mooseheads vs. (16) Saint John Sea Dogs

(2) Baie-Comeau Drakkar vs. (15) Sherbrooke Phoenix

(3) Blainville-Boisbriand Armada vs. (14) Acadie-Bathurst Titan

(4) Rimouski Océanic vs. (13) Gatineau Olympiques

(5) Quebec Remparts vs. (12) Chicoutimi Saguenéens

(6) Moncton Wildcats vs. (11) Victoriaville Tigres

(7) P.E.I. Rocket vs. (10) Val-d'Or Foreurs

(8) Rouyn-Noranda Huskies vs. (9) Drummondville Voltigeurs

Quarter-finals

(1) Halifax Mooseheads Vs. (13) Gatineau Olympiques

(2) Baie-Comeau Drakkar Vs. (11) Victoriaville Tigres

(3) Blainville-Boisbriand Armada Vs. (10) Val-d'Or Foreurs

(5) Quebec Remparts  Vs. (8) Rouyn-Noranda Huskies

Semi-finals

(1) Halifax Mooseheads Vs. (8) Rouyn-Noranda Huskies

(2) Baie-Comeau Drakkar Vs. (3) Blainville-Boisbriand Armada

Presidents Cup Finals

(1) Halifax Mooseheads Vs. (2) Baie-Comeau Drakkar

Playoff scoring leaders
Note: GP = Games played; G = Goals; A = Assists; Pts = Points; PIM = Penalty minutes

Playoff leading goaltenders

Note: GP = Games played; Mins = Minutes played; W = Wins; L = Losses: OTL = Overtime losses; SL = Shootout losses; GA = Goals Allowed; SO = Shutouts; GAA = Goals against average

Memorial Cup

Trophies and awards
Team
President's Cup - Playoff Champions: Halifax Mooseheads
Jean Rougeau Trophy - Regular Season Champions: Halifax Mooseheads
Luc Robitaille Trophy - Team that scored the most goals: Halifax Mooseheads
Robert Lebel Trophy - Team with best GAA: Halifax Mooseheads

Player
Michel Brière Memorial Trophy - Most Valuable Player: Jonathan Drouin, Halifax Mooseheads
Jean Béliveau Trophy - Top Scorer: Ben Duffy, P.E.I. Rocket
Guy Lafleur Trophy - Playoff MVP: Jonathan Drouin, Halifax Mooseheads
Jacques Plante Memorial Trophy - Top Goaltender: Étienne Marcoux, Blainville-Boisbriand Armada
Guy Carbonneau Trophy - Best Defensive Forward: Félix Girard, Baie-Comeau Drakkar 
Emile Bouchard Trophy - Defenceman of the Year: Kevin Gagné, Rimouski Océanic/Saint John Sea Dogs
Kevin Lowe Trophy - Best Defensive Defenceman: 
Mike Bossy Trophy - Top Prospect: Jonathan Drouin, Halifax Mooseheads
RDS Cup - Rookie of the Year: Valentin Zykov, Baie-Comeau Drakkar
Michel Bergeron Trophy - Offensive Rookie of the Year: Valentin Zykov, Baie-Comeau Drakkar 
Raymond Lagacé Trophy - Defensive Rookie of the Year: Philippe Desrosiers, Rimouski Océanic
Frank J. Selke Memorial Trophy - Most sportsmanlike player: Zach O'Brien, Acadie–Bathurst Titan
QMJHL Humanitarian of the Year - Humanitarian of the Year: Konrad Abeltshauser, Halifax Mooseheads
Marcel Robert Trophy - Best Scholastic Player: Charles-David Beaudoin, Drummondville Voltigeurs
Paul Dumont Trophy - Personality of the Year: Jonathan Drouin, Halifax Mooseheads

Executive
Ron Lapointe Trophy - Coach of the Year: Dominique Ducharme, Halifax Mooseheads
Maurice Filion Trophy - General Manager of the Year: Philippe Boucher, Rimouski Océanic
John Horman Trophy - Executive of the Year: 
Jean Sawyer Trophy - Marketing Director of the Year:

All-Star Teams
First All-Star Team:
 Zachary Fucale, Goaltender, Halifax Mooseheads
 Kevin Gagné, Defenceman, Rimouski Océanic/Saint John Sea Dogs
 Xavier Ouellet, Defenceman, Blainville-Boisbriand Armada
 Josh Currie, Centre, P.E.I. Rocket
 Jonathan Drouin, Left Wing, Halifax Mooseheads
 Dmitri Jaskin, Right Wing, Moncton Wildcats

Second All-Star Team:
 Étienne Marcoux, Goaltender, Blainville-Boisbriand Armada
 Mathieu Brisebois, Defenceman, Rouyn-Noranda Huskies
 Konrad Abeltshauser, Defenceman, Halifax Mooseheads
 Nathan MacKinnon, Centre, Halifax Mooseheads
 Peter Trainor, Left Wing, Rimouski Océanic
 Anthony Mantha, Right Wing, Val-d'Or Foreurs

All-Rookie Team:
 Philippe Desrosiers, Goaltender, Rimouski Océanic
 Jan Kostalek, Defenceman, Rimouski Océanic
 Mackenzie Weegar, Defenceman, Halifax Mooseheads
 Frédérik Gauthier, Centre, Rimouski Océanic
 Ivan Barbashev, Left Wing, Moncton Wildcats
 Valentin Zykov, Right Wing, Baie-Comeau Drakkar

See also
 2013 Memorial Cup
 List of QMJHL seasons
 2012–13 OHL season
 2012–13 WHL season
 2012 in ice hockey
 2013 in ice hockey

References

External links
 Official QMJHL website
 Official CHL website
 Official website of the Subway Super Series

Quebec Major Junior Hockey League seasons
QMJHL